Tayebi-ye Sarhadi-ye Sharqi Rural District is a rural district (dehestan) in Charusa District, Kohgiluyeh County, Kohgiluyeh and Boyer-Ahmad Province, Iran. In a 2006 census, its population was 9,063, in 1,635 families. The rural district has 72 villages.

References 

Rural Districts of Kohgiluyeh and Boyer-Ahmad Province
Kohgiluyeh County